The Trumpchi M8 is a minivan manufactured by GAC Group under the Trumpchi brand in China and the GAC Motor brand globally. Originally launched as the GM8 in 2017, it was renamed to simply M8 in 2021. The completely redesigned second generation M8 was launched in 2022.



First generation (2017-2022)

In China, the Trumpchi M8 and the previous GM8 is classified as a full-size seven-seat MPV, competing with cars like the Buick GL8. It was launched at the 2017 Auto Guangzhou as Trumpchi's first entry into the MPV segment. At launch, the GM8 is the largest passenger car that GAC has ever built and that makes it Trumpchi's flagship MPV. It was launched in the Chinese car market in the first quarter of 2018 with prices ranging from around 180,000 to 270,000 yuan. Originally shown in a seven-seat 2/2/3 setup, GAC also offers a longer variant with more seats.

The maximum engine power of the Trumpchi GM8 is 185.0kW with a maximum horsepower of 252PS and maximum torque of 390.0N·m.

Trumpchi GM8 Master Edition
As of early 2020, Trumpchi launched an upmarket and longer version of the current GM8 dubbed the Master Edition. The more upmarket Master Edition variant has a more pronounced snout than the regular GM8 and features a longer vehicle length with all the length added on the rear overhang.

Trumpchi M8 rename
A facelift for the 2021 model year features styling updates as well as a name change and price drop was revealed during the 2020 Beijing Auto Show in September 2020. The updated model was renamed to Trumpchi M8 to differentiate from the more expensive pre-facelift model. The facelift design was based on the Master Edition and becomes 23 mm (0.9”) longer than the pre-facelift model and is therefore 5,089 mm long, 1,884 mm wide and 1,822 mm tall with a 3-meter-long wheelbase. The updated Master Edition is 5,156 mm long. The facelift model features restyled instrumental panel, steering wheel and touch-enabled climate control interface. The gear switch now sits on top of the tunnel, and the diagonal size of the central display was increased. The engine remains the same unit while the transmission is an eight-speed Aisin transmission, and only front-wheel-drive in available.

Second generation (2022-present)

The second generation Trumpchi M8 debuted during the 2022 Chengdu Auto Show with a fuel engine version, a Mega Waves mild hybrid (HEV) version and PHEV (Plug-in Hybrid Electric Vehicle) variant. The second generation model petrol version gets a new 2.0-litre turbo engine with 251 hp and 380 Nm. The hybrid variant gets a 190 hp 2.0-litre turbo engine produced by Guangzhou Qisheng Powertrain Co., Ltd. with an electric motor adopting the fourth-generation enhanced THS II Toyota hybrid system. Gearbox options include a CVT and an 8-speed automatic transmission.

The interior of the second generation Trumpchi M8 adopts a 12.3-inch combined driving control instrument plus a 14.6-inch large suspended central control panel, with a new three-spoke multi-function steering wheel design.

See also
 List of GAC vehicles

References

External links 

 
 (Global)

GM8
M8
Minivans
Cars of China
Front-wheel-drive vehicles
Cars introduced in 2017